Snowy is an Australian television drama thriller series that screened on the Nine Network in 1993 and was produced by Simpson Le Mesurier Films. The program was not renewed for a second season.

Synopsis
Snowy was set around the project to build the Snowy Mountains Hydro-Electric Scheme in 1949. The Logan family run a small hotel in the remote and peaceful township of Cooma. The building of the Snowy project turns the Snowy Mountains region into a wild new frontier with the surge of hopeful immigrants, shady hustlers and colourful characters.

Cast
 Rebecca Gibney as Lilian Anderson
 Neil Melville as Jack Logan
 Lucy Bell as Kate Logan
 Bernard Curry as Michael Logan
 Catherine Wilkin as Molly Logan
 Jochen Horst as Wolfie Heimer
 Annie Jones as Eva Kovac
 William McInnes as Max Heimer
 Charlie Powles as Bernie O'Donnell
 Bill Kerr as Stuart McLachlan

Episodes

Home media 

Umbrella Entertainment released the complete series in May 2013 on DVD, Blu-Ray and on their steaming site.

Content Held By (National Film and Sound Archives)

See also 
 List of Australian television series

References

External links

 Snowy at the Australian Television Information Archive

Nine Network original programming
Australian drama television series
1993 Australian television series debuts
1993 Australian television series endings
1990s Australian drama television series
Television series by Beyond Television Productions